Khalida Inayat Noor is a Pakistani mathematician who was awarded with Pride of Performance award by the President of Pakistan in 2011. Her research topics include mathematical analysis, variational inequalities, and integral operators.

Biography
Khalida Noor got her Master's and Bachelor's degree from University of the Punjab in Lahore in 1967 and 1965 respectively and also got her  Master of Philosophy in mathematics from Islamabad University in 1968 and a Ph.D. from Wales University in 1972. From 1980 to 1981, she was a student advisor and member of the Board of Studies at Islamia University, Bahawalpur and from 1982 to 1988 was an Equivalence Committee member in Riyadh, Saudi Arabia.

In 2010, she was a member of the Editorial Board of many international journals of Mathematics and Engineering sciences, and had as many as 300 research papers published in leading world-class scientific journals. She is also a member of the Higher Education Commission of Pakistan and a Chartered Mathematician in the United Kingdom. Besides those qualifications, she also is a fellow of the Institute of Mathematics and its Applications. Noor is a professor of mathematics in the United Arab Emirates University. In October 1996, one of her papers appeared in the Journal of Mathematics.

Reputation as a mathematician
She is a fellow and member of the following Scientific Societies:
Member, American Mathematical Society, United States
Life Member, Punjab Mathematical Society, Pakistan
Fellow, Institute of Mathematics and its Applications, U.K.

References

External links

 Curriculum Vitae of Prof. Dr. Khalida Inayat Noor

20th-century births
20th-century Pakistani mathematicians
Women mathematicians
University of the Punjab alumni
21st-century Pakistani mathematicians
Recipients of the Pride of Performance
Living people
Year of birth missing (living people)